Esquivel is a surname of Basque origin as well as a place name.

Origin
The last name Esquivel (or Esquibel) has its origins in the village of Esquivel, located in the ayuntamiento of Mendoza, Álava, in Euskadi.

Meaning
Usually surnames were originated in the Basque Country as name of houses, being families known by the name of the house they inhabited once. Esquivel was originally spelled Ezkibel and evolved from the Basque words Ezki, which means lime tree, and Gibel, which means behind. Therefore, Esquivel means the house behind the lime trees.

People

Argentina
Adolfo Pérez Esquivel, Nobel Peace Prize recipient
George Esquivel, shoe designer and craftsman
Laura Natalia Esquivel, teen actress and singer

Costa Rica
Aniceto Esquivel Sáenz, former President of Costa Rica
Ascensión Esquivel Ibarra, Nicaraguan-born former of Costa Rica
Juan Bautista Esquivel, soccer player

Mexico
Carlos Esquivel, Mexican footballer
Juan García Esquivel, Mexican band leader, pianist and composer
Laura Esquivel, Mexican author
Yasmín Esquivel Mossa (born 1963), minister of the Supreme Court of Justice

Perú
 Rodrigo de Esquivel, conquistador (conqueror) and encomendero in Cuzco, 16th century
 Diego de Esquivel, first Marquis of San Lorenzo del Valleumbroso, Cuzco, 1687.

Spain
Emilio Morote Esquivel, novelist
Juan de Esquivel, explorer, first governor of Jamaica
Juan Esquivel Barahona, composer
Miguel de Álava y Esquivel, General and statesman

Other
Celso Esquivel, Paraguayan soccer player
Julia Esquivel, Guatemalan writer and human rights activist
Manuel Esquivel, former Belizean Prime Minister
Rafael Esquivel, former Venezuelan Football Federation directive.
Edith Esquivel, American-Mexican restaurant worker and civilian

References

Basque-language surnames
Surnames